The Boulder International Film Festival (BIFF), sponsored by the Colorado Film Society, is held annually on Presidents Day Weekend in Boulder, Colorado USA, and has developed a reputation as one of the most compelling young film festivals in the U.S., exhibiting a number of new-but-unknown feature films, documentaries, animations, and shorts that have gone on to significant box-office success and multiple Oscar nominations, including Monsieur Lazhar, Burma VJ, Revanche, Wasp, Miracle Fish, The Conscience of Nhem Eh, Waste Land, Incident in New Baghdad, Instead of Abracadabra, Raju, The Fantastic Flying Books of Mr. Morris Lessmore, West Bank Story, The Secret of Kells, 5 Broken Cameras, Chasing Ice, Curfew, Asad, The Missing Picture, and The Wind Rises. More than 23,600 filmmakers, national media, special guests and film enthusiasts attended the four-day BIFF 2014.

BIFF has shown the work of other honored filmmakers such as Danny Boyle, Jason Reitman, Daniel Junge, Helen Hunt, Marshall Curry, Luc Besson, and Lasse Halstrom.

The Founding of BIFF 
The Festival was founded in 2004 by two sisters from Boulder, CO, filmmakers Kathy and Robin Beeck. Having traveled extensively to film festivals worldwide with their films, the Beeck sisters saw Boulder as the perfect venue for a new festival which celebrated "the bold spirit of independent filmmaking." With BIFF, the sisters created what they perceived as a "filmmaker's film festival."

Festival co-creator Robin Beeck's secret to a great festival: “The theme of the festival is great storytelling. No matter what the budget, the mainstay has to be a wonderful, great story. We’ve got great stories that were expensive to make, and we have great stories that were made on a shoestring budget.”

Colorado Film Society 
The Colorado Film Society (CFS), a non-profit umbrella organization, hosts the annual Film Festival.  CFS is dedicated to nurturing and growing the vibrant film arts community in Boulder and along the Front Range.  The mission of the CFS is to encourage and celebrate the art of film by creating a dynamic forum for artistic, social and cultural awareness in the community. The CFS offers four programs throughout the year: (1) the Boulder International Film Festival (BIFF); (2) the CFS Educational Outreach Program; (3) the CFS Community Resource Program; and (4) the CFS Film Series.

The CFS also inspires tomorrow's film artists through year-round educational outreach programs, including “World Cinema Days” which bring international film, filmmakers, and presentations to local students; through Schmoozers, networking events which provide a venue for people involved or interested in the film arts and industry to mix and mingle, and through the CFS Community Resource Program, which provides various forms of no-cost support, resources and mentorship to many arts organizations in Boulder County.

Special guests and honorees

2005
The festival's inaugural season showcased more than 50 films from around the world. Among the highlights were documentaries such as Seoul Train, Mardi Gras: Made in China and The Liberace of Baghdad, the regional premiere of Danny Boyle's Millions, an early short from Jason Reitman, and The Real Old Testament, from Curtis and Paul Hannum.

2006
Special guest artists during BIFF's coldest year to date included Maria Bello, Patrick Warburton, Eric Roberts and screenwriter Amy Fox. Director Andrew Quigley received a Special Jury Prize for his documentary Diameter of the Bomb.

2007
An eclectic mix of guests included filmmaking duo Michael and Mark Polish, screenwriter John August, the Denver Slam Poetry Team, and a contingent of air-guitar masters, the latter in conjunction with the documentary Air Guitar Nation.

2008
Among the high points of the 2008 BIFF were Helen Hunt's directorial debut, And Then She Found Me, Alex Gibney's Taxi to the Dark Side, which won the Oscar shortly thereafter; concertizing by local performers including Hazel Miller and Otis Taylor; an offsite showing of Eisenstein's classic Alexander Nevsky, accompanied by the Boulder Philharmonic Orchestra playing the original score; and a sold-out closing night featuring the documentary Stranded: I've Come from a Plane That Crashed on the Mountains.

2009
Chevy Chase opened the 2009 Festival at the Boulder Theater. Chase received an Award of Excellence in Comedy which was followed by a film retrospective honoring his work. Chase additionally participated in a Q&A session hosted by BIFF executive producer Ron Bostwick.

"Not only has Mr. Chase graced so many classic comedic films and been a major influence to countless comedians, he has also been a tireless advocate for this country's environmental movement which Coloradans are so passionate about," said festival co-founder/director Kathy Beek. "We are truly honored Chevy is able to join us for a lively start to the festival."

BIFF was voted one of the “25 Coolest Film Festivals” MovieMaker Magazine.

2010
Closing Night of BIFF 2010 was a tribute to Alec Baldwin, which included a film retrospective of his work followed by a question and answer session hosted by Bostwick.

Three weeks following BIFF, Baldwin co-hosted the 2010 Academy Awards ceremony with his It’s Complicated co-star Steve Martin. Baldwin stars with Tina Fey on NBC's 30 Rock, winner of the Emmy for Outstanding Comedy Series for the past three years. He has received three SAG Awards, two Golden Globes, the Television Critics Award, and two Emmies for Best Actor in a Comedy Series.

"We are thrilled to have Mr. Baldwin attending the Boulder International Film Festival," said Kathy Beeck, festival co-founder and director.  "He’s a magnificent actor who has influenced many young actors and comedians, and we’re honored he will join us at this year’s festival."

2011
Besides featuring visits by Oliver Stone and James Franco, BIFF 2011 was crammed with significant content. From the festive opening-night feature "Troubadors" through the vibrant madness of The Last Circus, an examination of the controversial legacy of Chogyam Trungpa Rinpoche in Crazy Wisdom, a look at film preservation in These Amazing Shadows, Bag It!, '"For Once in My Life, Armadillo, among others, BIFF truly covered the world. Most moving was a Freedom Riders'' post-screening conversation with Congressman John Lewis.

2012
William H. Macy and Martin Sheen were honored at the 2012 BIFF where both actors appeared to speak on stage as well as host a Q&A session. Producer Anthony Bregman and screenwriter Lawrence Kasdan were honorary guests as well.

2013
Peter Fonda was BIFF's closing-night guest in 2013. BIFF's Singer/Songwriter Showcase really came into its own that year, and educational outreach programs such as the Youth Pavilion, CU @ BIFF (BIFF's college-level program in association with the University of Colorado), and expanded workshops and panels all attracted new crowds.

2014
Shirley MacLaine received the Career Achievement Award during her tribute at BIFF in 2014. For the first time, BIFF's fundraising FOOVIE (food and a movie) sold out and raised $15,000 for year-round BIFF programming. In addition, 2014 saw the release of an open-source Call 2 Action Toolkit that film festivals across the globe can use to easily adopt the festival's signature Call 2 Action program, joining the movement to harness the power of film for positive social change.

2018 
Josh Walker, Rodes Rollins and Dallas Thornton performed at the 2018 BIFF Singer-Songwriter Showcase in Boulder Colorado.

2020
Jeff Orlowski won the "Impact DOCS Awards Film.

Educational Outreach & Youth Advisory Council 
In keeping with its commitment to bringing independent films to a wider audience the Festival formed a Youth Advisory Council (YAC). The Council was founded in 2008 and is made up of 12-15 local film enthusiasts in grades 8-12. The Council represents a youth voice at the Festival and helps select films for its student film program, juries the student film category and helps organize and promote film opportunities for students in Boulder County.

In addition to its Youth Advisory Council, BIFF hosts several 'World Cinema Days' throughout the school year. Their goal is to keep students meaningfully engaged by screening thoughtful student appropriate documentaries, films and animation during unstructured days off such as teacher “professional development” or “in-service days.” And to help parents arrange activities for their child on these non-school days. Features a free film program, presentations and group discussion for students in grade 4 through 12.

BIFF also works closely with the Boulder Public Library in offering free film to Boulder audiences through its 'Spotlight on BIFF' series at the Boulder Public Library Film Program in September, October, and November. The Spotlight includes ten “Best of the Fest” films and is free to students and the public.

Festival Winners 

BIFF 2022

BIFF 2021

BIFF 2020

BIFF 2019

BIFF 2018

BIFF 2017

BIFF 2015

BIFF 2014

BIFF 2013

BIFF 2012

BIFF 2011

BIFF 2010

BIFF 2009

BIFF 2008

BIFF 2007

BIFF 2006

BIFF 2005

References

External links
 Official site

Film festivals in Colorado
Culture of Boulder, Colorado